Amir Juan Chamdin, born 4 June 1974, is a Swedish director and musician, renowned for his work across music videos, feature films and TV series.

Amir Chamdin first made a name for himself as the front figure of the Swedish hip hop band Infinite Mass. After starting his career on stage performing with the band he later achieved recognition when he turned into a director. Highlights include MTV Best Video winner “You're the Storm” for ((The Cardigans)), the feature film sensation ((Cornelis))—about one of Sweden's greatest music legends, and the crime-thriller ((Hassel)) which reached number 1 as the most watches new series in Sweden and Finland in 2017.

In 2020, Chamdin received the award for 'Best Series' at CANNESSERIES for his original TV series, Partisan, which premiered on Viaplay in August the same year. Partisan set a record for the most-viewed Viaplay original show on its premiere night.

Biography 
Amir Juan Chamdin was born in Huddinge (Sweden) and raised in Södermalm, Stockholm. His father is Syrian Muslim[1] and his mother is Finnish.[2] Chamdin is a front figure in the groundbreaking Swedish hip hop group Infinite Mass since their formation in 1991. Directing and creating the visual world of the band gave him acknowledgment and a stepping-stone to become a full-time director.  Working closely with other bands like The Hellacopters, Ghost and The Cardigans was a natural fit and the innovative film school he never had.

In 2001, Infinite Mass released their third studio album The Face on Polar/Universal. The album was a major success and the album's first single ”Bullet” featuring Roger Daltrey became an instant hit and gold record. Chamdin also had the lead role in The Artist, a short film made in New York.

In 2002, Chamdin became the third director of RAF (Renck Åkerlund Films). Working alongside his long-time friends and accomplished brethren Jonas Åkerlund and Johan Renck.

It was 2004 when Chamdin received MTV's coveted Best Music Video Award for The Cardigans’ “You're The Storm.”  2004 was also the year when Infinite Mass dropped their 4th studio album 1991 gaining the title; most played band/artist on Swedish radio in 2004 ahead of Outcast and Scissor Sisters. It was also now that Amir & Dregen from Backyard Babies formed Snowracer, a progressive electronic band together with Martin ”Nåid” Landquist and Brady Blade. The debut album was released in 2005 with Universal and featured various guest artist such as Emmylou Harris.

In 2005, he founded the production company Chamdin & Stöhr with producer Martina Stöhr Torell and Daniel Sachs. Together they have produced a number of international award-winning commercials for clients such as H&M, IKEA, adidas and The Andy Warhol Exhibition. Amir Chamdin decided to act again, playing Heberson Da Costa in the TV series Lasermannen (The Laser Man).

In 2006, Chamdins made his cinematic debut as a director. The black & white feature film was God Willing, starring himself and Nina Persson.[4] Variety wrote of the film: “God Willing looks like no other Swedish film of recent years. This melancholy love story about two would-be lovers during a moment in 1975.″  The film received the Kodak Visionary Award in 2006 and was nominated in several international film festivals.

In 2006, Chamdin won a Silver Egg for his black & white short film Banana Party, shot by Hoyte van Hoytema and premiered on MTV.

In 2009, Chamdin released the self titled debut album Mean Streets thru Warner, written and performed together with Nicke Andersson.

In 2010, Chamdin's second feature Cornelis premiered and starred Hank von Hell, the famous lead singer from the death-punk band Turbonegro. Cornelis went straight to the No. 1 at the box office in Sweden and Norway. H&M approached Amir with the mission of creating a visual cohesive forum on television and for the instore/outdoor  screens. This became a massive campaign with over 100 commercials with stars such as: Bryan Ferry, Daria Werbowy, Lou Dillon, Freja Beha amongst others. The music was performed by Erykah Badu covering Muddy Waters  ”Mannish Boy”.

In 2013, Loudwire named Ghost and the "Year Zero" music video directed by Amir Chamdin, the Best Metal Video of 2013,[7] while Revolver named it seventh on their list of the year's best in all genres. "Year Zero" and its music video were nominated for Best Metal Song and Best Metal Video in the 2013 Loudwire Music Awards.  2013 was also the year when Amir Chamdin directed Gisele Bündchen in a music video, covering The Kinks "All Day and All of the Night", filmed on the streets of London.

In 2014, Chamdin made a short film with Gösta Ekman in a campaign for Höj Rösten (Raise The Voice) calling out for people to vote.

Harper's Bazaar wrote "Four of the world's top models have been given the James Bond treatment for H&M's new 2015 swimwear campaign, which makesa nice change from the standard rolling-around-on-beach variety.” Adriana Lima, Doutzen Kroes, Joan Smalls and Natasha Poly stars in the Chamdin directed film with music by Axwell & Ingrosso. In 2015, Chamdin directed a black & white commercial for Mango featuring music from The Kills, starring Jamie Hince and Karlie Kloss.

In 2017, Chamdin directed his first original TV series, Hassel, a realistic, hard boiled police thriller series inspired by the iconic detective Roland Hassel starring Ola Rapace. Chamdin was brought in as a lead director and a conceptual director for the 10 episodic drama, creating the visual world bringing new life to the scandic-noir genre. Hassel is distributed in Scandinavia by streaming giant Viaplay and produced by Nice Drama.

Films 

 2006 Amir Chamdin made his cinematic debut with the film God Willing (Om gud Vill), which starred Nina Persson from The Cardigans and Amir himself. When seeing the film Jack White (The White Stripes) decided to give Amir Chamdin permission to record a new version of the song "Dead Leaves and the Dirty Ground". This later became the theme song of the movie. The film also received the Kodak Visionary Award in 2006 and was nominated in several international film festivals such as, The Chicago International Film Festival, Taipei International Film Festival, Manila International Film Festival, Guldbaggen etc. etc.
 2008 Amir Chamdin directed a short film for The Andy Warhol Exhibition / Moderna museet. Amir Chamdin wrote and directed Kim Bodnia in "Musical Chairs" (Hela Havet Stormar) which premiered in Göteborg International Film Festival 2009.
 2010 Amir Chamdin feature film Cornelis premiered in Sweden and Norway. Cornelis being the unique chronicle about one of Sweden's greatest music legends Cornelis Vreeswijk. Amir Chamdin made an unexpected move casting Hank Von Hell (Turbonegro) as Cornelis. Cornelis went straight to no. 1 at the box office in Sweden and it has been very well received throughout the Nordic countries.
 2017 Amir Chamdins first TV series Hassel premiered on Viaplay starring Ola Rapace. Hassel is a realistic, hard-boiled and direct police thriller series inspired by the iconic detective Roland Hassel. Nicke Andersson (The Hellacopters) made the soundtrack and the title song is Roky Erickson's "It's a Cold Night For Alligators". Hassel reached number 1 as the most watched new series in Sweden and Finland in 2017.
 2020 Amir Chamdin created and directed 'Partisan' a five-episode crime drama which premiered on Viaplay starring Fares Fares and Johan Rheborg. The series is set in the idyllic surroundings of Jordnära, a gated community that runs a very successful organic farm. We get to follow a man who takes a job offer, soon learning about their unorthodox rules and routines. The soundtrack of the series is the iconic The Partisan by Leonard Cohen.

Awards 

 MTV Award Best Music Video - The Cardigans - "You're The Storm"
 Kodak Visionary Award for ”God Willing” 2006
 Loudwire Music Awards - Best Metal Video - Ghost ”Year Zero”
 Epica/Gold – IKEA “comeintomycloset”
 Euro best/Gold – IKEA “comeintomycloset”
 NY Festival Innovative/Gold – Best use of music/sound – IKEA“comeintomycloset”
 NY Festival Innovative/Gold – Household appliances/furnishings –IKEA“comeintomycloset”
 SilverÄgg – Banana Party (MTV Short film)
 Epica/Silver – Nellonen “Ugly Betty”
 London International Awards – Television/Cinema: Campaign TELE2 “Big Bills Are History”
 Grammis Award Modern Dance: Infinite Mass "The Infinite Patio"
 Swedish Dance Music Award /  Best Dance Track:  ”Area Turns Red” Infinite Mass
 Swedish Dance Music Award Best Album: ”The Infinite Patio” Infinite Mass
 Swedish Dance Music Award Best Hip Hop Artist: Infinite Mass
 'Best Series' at CANNESSERIES - 'Partisan' (Tv-series)

Filmography

Discography 
Albums

"Infinite Mass” EP (1993) Infinite Mass Records

”The Infinite Patio” Infinite Mass (1995) Roof Top

”Ride” EP Infinite Mass (1995) Roof Top

”Alwayz Somethang” Infinite Mass (1997) Warlock Records

”Live in Sweden” Infinite Mass (1998) Murlyn

”Bullet” EP Infinite Mass (2001) Polar / Universal

”The Face” Infinite Mass (2001)Polar / Universal

”1991” Infinite Mass (2004) Warner

”Ta-Da-Da-Da” Snowracer (2005) Universal

”Masters Of The Universe” Infinite Mass (2007) Infinite Mass Records

”Mean Streets” Mean Streets (2009) Sheriff / Warner

Soundtracks

”Shoot the Racist” Infinite Mass Soundtrack / Sökarna (1993) Polygram

”Meter Running” Amir Chamdin Soundtrack / Upp Till Kamp (2007) Razzia Records

”Lady Luck” Amir Chamdin Soundtrack / Leo (2007) Memfis Film

Singles

”Mah Boyz” Infinite Mass (1995) Roof Top / BMG

”Nine 5 Vibe” Infinite Mass (1995) Roof Top / BMG

”Area Turns Red” Infinite Mass (1995) Roof Top / BMG

”Ride” Infinite Mass (1996) Roof Top / BMG

”Caught Up In Da Game” Infinite Mass (1997) Warlock Records

”Fo' Sho” Infinite Mass (1997) Warlock Records

”Massacre” Infinite Mass (1997) Warlock Records

”Babylon” Backyard Babies & Ginger (1999) Coalition Records

”Enter The Dragon” Infinite Mass (2000) Warner

”Bullet” Infinite Mass Featuring Roger Daltrey (2001) Polar / Universal

”She's A Freak” Infinite Mass Featuring Linda Sundblad (2001) Polar / Universal

”Blazin’” Infinite Mass (2002) Polar / Universal

”Celebrate” Infinite Mass (2002) Polar / Universal

”No 1. Swartskalle” Infinite Mass (2004) Warner

”The Thief” Infinite Mass (2004) Warner

”Fire Fire” Infinite Mass (2004) Warner

”Native American” Snowracer (2005) Universal

”The Way I'm watching You” Snowracer featuring Emmylou Harris (2005) Universal

External links
 Amir Chamdin on IMDb.com
 About Hassel http://www.nordiskfilmogtvfond.com/news/stories/local-tv-series-boost-viaplay
 Cornelis movie https://www.svd.se/dar-och-da-med-cornelis
 Mean Streets http://www.headstomp.com/mean-streets
 Interview about Hassel http://dramaquarterly.com/tag/ola-rapace/ http://dramaquarterly.com/tag/amir-chamdin/

References

Swedish male actors
Swedish film directors
Swedish male musicians
1974 births
Living people
Swedish people of Finnish descent
Swedish people of Syrian descent